Benjamin Dolić (born 4 May 1997), known professionally as Ben Dolic, is a Slovenian singer. He gained popularity in Germany after his participation in the eighth season of The Voice of Germany. Dolic would have represented Germany in the Eurovision Song Contest 2020 held in Rotterdam with the song "Violent Thing" before it was cancelled due to the COVID-19 pandemic.

Career

Early career 
At the age of 12, Dolic was a contestant in Slovenija ima talent, the Slovenian version of Got Talent, in which he reached the semi-final. He then began competing in numerous song festivals for children, such as the Turkish Olympics, where he won a silver medal and headed on tour around Turkey, performing in stadiums and arenas for up to 40,000 people. While in high school, he became part of the group D Base. With the group he participated in EMA 2016, the Slovenian preselection for the Eurovision Song Contest 2016.

2018: The Voice of Germany 
In 2018, Dolic auditioned for the eighth season of The Voice of Germany with the song "No Tears Left to Cry" by Ariana Grande. He caught the interest of judges Yvonne Catterfeld and Mark Forster and headed into the next round joining team Yvonne. This led him all the way to the final, where Ben performed with Swedish Pop star Zara Larsson and finished second, behind the winner  Samuel Rösch. Ben embarked upon The Voice of Germany Live in Concert Tour and performed in multiple arenas across Germany and Austria.

2020: Eurovision Song Contest 
On 27 February 2020, the German broadcaster ARD announced that Dolic had been internally selected to represent Germany in the Eurovision Song Contest 2020 held in Rotterdam, Netherlands with the song "Violent Thing". The single was Ben’s debut release and very quickly made its way into the German airplay charts, major Spotify editorial playlists and was a fan favourite for the competition. However, on 18 March, 2020, the event was cancelled due to the coronavirus outbreak, deeming Ben a possible re-entry in the years to come.

Discography

Singles

External links
Biography at Universal Music Group
Performances at The Voice of Germany
Eurovision Song Contest Rotterdam 2020

References

1997 births
Living people
Musicians from Ljubljana
21st-century Slovenian male singers
Eurovision Song Contest entrants of 2020
Eurovision Song Contest entrants for Germany
The Voice of Germany
Slovenian expatriates in Germany
Slovenian people of Bosnia and Herzegovina descent